Ukai Thermal Power Station of the Gujarat State Electricity Corporation Limited, India, is a power station with an installed capacity of 1,110 MW. It is one of Gujarat's major coal-fired power plants, located on the bank of the Tapi river.

Power plant
Ukai Thermal Power Station is located on the banks of the Tapi because of the water resources, along with the hydroelectric power plant with the same name. Ukai TPS Unit-1 is the first power station unit in India with a capacity more than 100 MW.

Installed capacity

Ukai TPS unit-6 was first unit in GSECL having a capacity more than 500 MW.

Transport
It is on the Jalgaon-Surat branch line of Western Railway. Coal-based thermal power stations consume large quantities of coal. For example, the Ukai Thermal Power Station consumed 3,200,000 tonnes of coal in 2006–07. Around 80 per cent of the domestic coal supplies in India are meant for coal based thermal power plants and coal transportation forms 42 per cent of the total freight earnings of Indian railways.

See also 

 Gandhinagar Thermal Power Station
 Wanakbori Thermal Power Station
 Sikka Thermal Power Station
 Dhuvaran Thermal Power Station
 Kutch Thermal Power Station
 Gujarat State Electricity Corporation Limited

References 

Coal-fired power stations in Gujarat
Tapi district
1976 establishments in Gujarat
Energy infrastructure completed in 1976
20th-century architecture in India